Veliki Okič is a settlement in the Haloze Hills in eastern Slovenia. It lies close to the border with Croatia in the Municipality of Videm. The area traditionally belonged to the Styria region. It is now included in the Drava Statistical Region.

References

External links
Veliki Okič on Geopedia

Populated places in the Municipality of Videm